Puerto Rico Highway 888 (PR-888) is a road located in Cataño, Puerto Rico. It goes from PR-165 in Palmas barrio to downtown Cataño, bordering San Juan Bay until its end at PR-5 in La Puntilla sector. The entire route is known as Avenida Las Nereidas.

Major intersections

See also

 List of highways numbered 888

References

888
Cataño, Puerto Rico